Saint George is a civil parish in Charlotte County, New Brunswick, Canada, located between St. Stephen and Saint John. Local governance is provided by two local service districts (LSDs), that are members of the Southwest New Brunswick Service Commission (SNBSC).

The Census subdivision of the same name includes all of the parish except St. George.

Origin of name
Historian William Francis Ganong believed the name suggested by other Saint names in the area.

Five of the original six mainland parishes of Charlotte County used names of major saints recognised by the Church of England: Andrew (Scotland), David (Wales), George (England), Patrick (Ireland), and Stephen.

History
Saint George was erected in 1786 as one of the original parishes of Charlotte County.

Boundaries
Saint George Parish is bounded:

 on the north by the York County line;
 on the east by a line beginning on the prolongation of the eastern line of grants crossing Lake Utopia then running southerly along the prolongation and the grants to the Letang River, then down the river and through Letang Harbour, passing east of Hills Island, to the Bay of Fundy;
 on the south by the Bay of Fundy, the Letete Passage, and Passamaquoddy Bay;
 on the west by a line beginning near the western end of Shore Road on the prolongation of the western line of a tier of grants along the Magaguadavic River, then running north along the western line of the tier and its prolongation to York County.

Evolution of boundaries
The southern line of the Cape Ann Association grant in Saint David Parish was prolonged eastward to the Saint John County to provide the northern line of all parishes in the eastern part of Charlotte County; in Saint George's case the line cut through McDougall Lake. The western line of the parish was the same; the eastern line ran along the eastern side of the Letang River, Letang Harbour, putting all the islands in them in Saint George; the southern boundary extended to include all islands within  of the coast, including islands that are now part of West Isles Parish. The eastern line diverted around a grant on the Letang River that's mostly in Pennfield Parish along Route 785.

In 1814 the parish was extended north to the county line.

In 1850 the eastern line was extended south to the Letang River, taking part of Pennfield Parish; the Letang boundary was reworded, implying that the western shore was the new boundary of Saint George.

In 1877 the water boundaries of Saint George were altered and clarified, now running through the channel of Letang River and Harbour, then west through Letete Passage, transferring several islands to West Isles Parish.

Local service districts
Both LSDs assess for the basic LSD services of fire protection, police services, land use planning, emergency measures, and dog control.

Saint George Parish
The local service district of the parish of Saint George originally included all of the parish outside St. George.

The LSD was established in 1970 to assess for fire protection. First aid & ambulance services were added in 1975 and community services to the Bonny River-Second Falls service area in 1991.

Today the LSD assesses for only basic services. The taxing authorities are 515.00 Saint George and 515.01 Bonny River-Second Falls.

Bonny River-Second Falls formerly had enhanced services and is sometimes inaccurately described as an LSD in its own right in the Magaguadavic River from the parish line south almost to the Old St. Andrews Road and grants east of the river from the Red Rock Road to The Canal. It

Fundy Bay
Fundy Bay comprises the mainland south of Route 1 and St. George.

The LSD was established in 1978 to add recreational facilities.

Today the LSD additionally assesses for community & recreation services. The taxing authority is 525.00 Fundy Bay.

Communities
Communities at least partly within the parish. italics indicate a name no longer in official use

 Back Bay
 Bonny River
 Breadalbane
 Caithness
 Canal
 Elmcroft
 Greens Point
 Lee Settlement
 Letang
 Letete
 Mascarene
 Pomeroy
 St. George
 Second Falls
 Upper Letang
 Utopia

Bodies of water
Bodies of water at least partly within the parish.

 Bonny River
 Letang River
 Magaguadavic River
 Lake Stream
 Linton Stream
 Piskahegan Stream
 Red Rock Stream
 Trout Lake Stream
 Addies Creek
 Lelands Creek
 McDougall Outlet
 The Canal
 Hinds Bay
 Lime Kiln Bay
 Passamaquoddy Bay
 Scotch Bay
 Bliss Harbour
 Letang Harbour
 Magaguadavic Basin
 Letete Passage
 Lake Utopia
 more than a dozen other officially named lakes

Islands
Islands at least partly within the parish.

 Bar Island
 Big Island
 Bliss Island
 Cannonball Island
 Cooks Island
 Crow Island
 Douglas Island
 Eagle Island
 Flea Island
 Fox Island
 Frye Island
 Grassy Islands
 Hills Island
 Hog Island
 Howards Island
 Hoyt Island
 Hoyt Nub
 Jail Island
 Long Island
 Man of War Island
 McGraws Island
 Mink Island
 Morans Island
 Park Islands
 Spruce Island
 Thumb Island
 Tub Island
 Turnover Island
 Vernon Island
 White Head Island

Other notable places
Parks, historic sites, and other noteworthy places at least partly within the parish.
 Magaguadavic Protected Natural Area
 Utopia Game Refuge

Demographics
Parish population total does not include the former incorporated town of St. George

Population

Language

Access routes
Highways and numbered routes that run through the parish, including external routes that start or finish at the parish limits:

Highways

Principal routes

Secondary routes:

External routes:
L'Etete to Deer Island Ferry

See also
List of parishes in New Brunswick

Notes

References

Parishes of Charlotte County, New Brunswick